Agrahara (Arkalgud)  is a village in the southern state of Karnataka, India. It is located in the Arkalgud taluk of Hassan district in Karnataka

References

External links
 http://Hassan.nic.in/

Villages in Hassan district